is a Japanese equestrian. He competed in eventing at the 2012 Summer Olympics and the 2020 Summer Olympics.

References

Japanese male equestrians
Living people
Olympic equestrians of Japan
Equestrians at the 2012 Summer Olympics
Asian Games medalists in equestrian
Equestrians at the 2014 Asian Games
1985 births
Sportspeople from Fukuoka Prefecture
Asian Games silver medalists for Japan
Medalists at the 2014 Asian Games
Equestrians at the 2020 Summer Olympics